The  red-spotted lizard (Mesalina rubropunctata) is a species of sand-dwelling lizard in the family Lacertidae. It occurs in Morocco, Western Sahara, Algeria, Libya, Egypt, Mauritania, Mali, Niger, and Sudan.

References

rubropunctata
Reptiles described in 1823
Taxa named by Hinrich Lichtenstein